William Carl Choisser (July 10, 1895 – September 25, 1939) was an American newspaper editor, lawyer, and politician.

Choisser was born in Ozark, Johnson County, Illinois. In 1917, he graduated from the University of Illinois College of Law, where he received a bachelor of laws, and was on the varsity wrestling team. He then served in the United States Army Air Service during World War I. Choisser practiced law in Benton, Illinois, and was the editor of the Benton Evening News. Choisser served in the Illinois House of Representatives from 1923 to 1929 and was a Republican. In 1939, Choisser was murdered with a firearm in Benton, Illinois, after a quarrel with a defendant involving a murder trial.

Notes

External links

1895 births
1939 deaths
People from Benton, Illinois
People from Johnson County, Illinois
Military personnel from Illinois
University of Illinois College of Law alumni
Editors of Illinois newspapers
Illinois lawyers
Republican Party members of the Illinois House of Representatives
Deaths by firearm in Illinois
People murdered in Illinois
Male murder victims
Assassinated American politicians
United States Army Air Service pilots of World War I
Illinois Fighting Illini wrestlers
20th-century American politicians
20th-century American lawyers

Assassinated American former elected officials